The Hawker Siddeley Harrier is a British military aircraft. It was the first of the Harrier series of aircraft and was developed in the 1960s as the first operational ground attack and reconnaissance aircraft with vertical/short takeoff and landing (V/STOL) capabilities and the only truly successful V/STOL design of that era. The Harrier was developed directly from the Hawker Siddeley Kestrel prototype aircraft, following the cancellation of a more advanced supersonic aircraft, the Hawker Siddeley P.1154. In the late 1960s, the Harrier GR.1 and GR.3 variants were ordered by the British government for the Royal Air Force (RAF). It was exported to the United States as the AV-8A, for use by the US Marine Corps (USMC), in the 1970s.

During the Harrier's service the RAF positioned the bulk of the aircraft in West Germany to defend against a potential invasion of Western Europe by the Warsaw Pact forces; the unique abilities of the Harrier allowed the RAF to disperse their forces away from vulnerable airbases. The USMC used their Harriers primarily for close air support, operating from amphibious assault ships, and, if needed, forward operating bases. Harrier squadrons saw several deployments overseas. The Harrier's ability to operate with minimal ground facilities and very short runways allowed it to be used at locations unavailable to other fixed-wing aircraft. The Harrier received criticism for having a high accident rate and for a time-consuming maintenance process.

In the 1970s the British Aerospace Sea Harrier was developed from the Harrier for use by the Royal Navy (RN) on s. The Sea Harrier and the Harrier fought in the 1982 Falklands War, in which the aircraft proved to be crucial and versatile. The RN Sea Harriers provided fixed-wing air defence while the RAF Harriers focused on ground-attack missions in support of the advancing British land force. The Harrier was also extensively redesigned as the AV-8B Harrier II and British Aerospace Harrier II by the team of McDonnell Douglas and British Aerospace.

Development

Origins

The Harrier's design was derived from the Hawker P.1127. Prior to developing the P.1127 Hawker Aircraft had been working on a replacement for the Hawker Hunter, the Hawker P.1121. The P.1121 was cancelled after the release of the British Government's 1957 Defence White Paper, which advocated a policy shift away from manned aircraft and towards missiles. This policy resulted in the termination of the majority of aircraft development projects then underway for the British military. Hawker sought to quickly move on to a new project and became interested in Vertical Take Off/Landing (VTOL) aircraft, which did not need runways. According to Air Chief Marshal Sir Patrick Hine this interest may have been stimulated by the presence of Air Staff Requirement 345, which sought a V/STOL ground attack fighter for the Royal Air Force.

Design work on the P.1127 was formally started in 1957 by Sir Sydney Camm, Ralph Hooper of Hawker Aircraft, and Stanley Hooker (later Sir Stanley Hooker) of the Bristol Engine Company. The close cooperation between Hawker, the airframe company, and Bristol, the engine company, was viewed by project engineer Gordon Lewis as one of the key factors that allowed the development of the Harrier to continue in spite of technical obstacles and political setbacks. Rather than using rotors or a direct jet thrust, the P.1127 had an innovative vectored thrust turbofan engine, the Pegasus. A contract for two development prototypes was signed in June 1960 and the first flight followed in October 1960. Of the six prototypes built, three crashed, including one during an air display at the 1963 Paris Air Show.

Tripartite evaluation

In 1961 the United Kingdom, the United States and West Germany jointly agreed to purchase nine aircraft developed from the P.1127, for the evaluation of the performance and potential of V/STOL aircraft. These aircraft were built by Hawker Siddeley and were designated Kestrel FGA.1 by the UK. The Kestrel was strictly an evaluation aircraft and to save money the Pegasus 5 engine was not fully developed as intended, only having  of thrust instead of the projected . The Tripartite Evaluation Squadron numbered ten pilots; four each from the UK and US and two from West Germany. The Kestrel's first flight took place on 7 March 1964.

A total of 960 sorties had been made during the trials, including 1,366 takeoffs and landings, by the end of evaluations in November 1965. One aircraft was destroyed in an accident and six others were transferred to the United States, assigned the US designation XV-6A Kestrel, and underwent further testing. The two remaining British-based Kestrels were assigned to further trials and experimentation at RAE Bedford with one being modified to use the uprated Pegasus 6 engine.

P.1154

At the time of the development of the P.1127 Hawker and Bristol had also undertaken considerable development work on a supersonic version, the Hawker Siddeley P.1154, to meet a North Atlantic Treaty Organization (NATO) requirement issued for such an aircraft. The design used a single Bristol Siddeley BS100 engine with four swivelling nozzles, in a fashion similar to the P.1127, and required the use of plenum chamber burning (PCB) to achieve supersonic speeds. The P.1154 won the competition to meet the requirement against strong competition from other aircraft manufacturers such as Dassault Aviation's Mirage IIIV. The French government did not accept the decision and withdrew; the NATO requirement was cancelled shortly after in 1965.

The Royal Air Force and the Royal Navy planned to develop and introduce the supersonic P.1154 independently of the cancelled NATO requirement. This ambition was complicated by the conflicting requirements between the two services—while the RAF wanted a low-level supersonic strike aircraft, the Navy sought a twin-engine air defence fighter. Following the election of the Labour Government of 1964 the P.1154 was cancelled, as the Royal Navy had already begun procurement of the McDonnell Douglas Phantom II and the RAF placed a greater importance on the BAC TSR-2's ongoing development. Work continued on elements of the project, such as a supersonic PCB-equipped Pegasus engine, with the intention of developing a future Harrier variant for the decades following cancellation.

Production
Following the collapse of the P.1154's development the RAF began considering a simple upgrade of the existing subsonic Kestrel and issued Requirement ASR 384 for a V/STOL ground attack jet. Hawker Siddeley received an order for six pre-production aircraft in 1965, designated P.1127 (RAF), of which the first made its maiden flight on 31 August 1966. An order for 60 production aircraft, designated as Harrier GR.1, was received in early 1967. The aircraft was named after the Harrier, a small bird of prey.

The Harrier GR.1 made its first flight on 28 December 1967. It officially entered service with the RAF on 1 April 1969 and the Harrier Conversion Unit at RAF Wittering received its first aircraft on 18 April. The aircraft were built in two factories—one in Kingston upon Thames, southwest London, and the other at Dunsfold Aerodrome, Surrey—and underwent initial testing at Dunsfold. The ski-jump technique for launching Harriers from Royal Navy aircraft carriers was extensively trialled at RNAS Yeovilton from 1977. Following these tests ski-jumps were added to the flight decks of all RN carriers from 1979 onwards, in preparation for the new variant for the navy, the Sea Harrier.

In the late 1960s the British and American governments held talks on producing Harriers in the United States. Hawker Siddeley and McDonnell Douglas formed a partnership in 1969 in preparation for American production, but Congressman Mendel Rivers and the House Appropriations Committee held that it would be cheaper to produce the AV-8A on the pre-existing production lines in the United Kingdom—hence all AV-8A Harriers were purchased from Hawker Siddeley. Improved Harrier versions with better sensors and more powerful engines were developed in later years. The USMC received 102 AV-8A and 8 TAV-8A Harriers between 1971 and 1976.

Design

Overview
The Harrier was typically used as a ground attack aircraft, though its manoeuvrability also allows it to effectively engage other aircraft at short ranges. The Harrier is powered by a single Pegasus turbofan engine mounted in the fuselage. The engine is fitted with two air intakes and four vectoring nozzles for directing the thrust generated: two for the bypass flow and two for the jet exhaust. Several small reaction nozzles are also fitted, in the nose, tail and wingtips, for the purpose of balancing during vertical flight. It has two landing gear units on the fuselage and two outrigger landing gear units, one near each wing tip. The Harrier is equipped with four wing and three fuselage pylons for carrying a variety of weapons and external fuel tanks.

The Kestrel and the Harrier were similar in appearance, though approximately 90 per cent of the Kestrel's airframe was redesigned for the Harrier. The Harrier was powered by the more powerful Pegasus 6 engine; new air intakes with auxiliary blow-in doors were added to produce the required airflow at low speed. Its wing was modified to increase area and the landing gear was strengthened. Several hardpoints were installed, two under each wing and one underneath the fuselage; two  ADEN cannon gun pods could also be fitted to the underside of the fuselage. The Harrier was outfitted with updated avionics to replace the basic systems used in the Kestrel; a navigational-attack system incorporating an inertial navigation system, originally for the P.1154, was installed and information was presented to the pilot by a head-up display and a moving map display.

The Harrier's VTOL abilities allowed it to be deployed from very small prepared clearings or helipads as well as normal airfields. It was believed that, in a high-intensity conflict, air bases would be vulnerable and likely to be quickly knocked out. The capability to scatter Harrier squadrons to dozens of small "alert pads" on the front lines was highly prized by military strategists and the USMC procured the aircraft because of this ability. Hawker Siddeley noted that STOL operation provided additional benefits over VTOL operation, saving fuel and allowing the aircraft to carry more ordnance.

The Harrier, while serving for many decades in various forms, has been criticised on multiple issues; in particular a high accident rate, though Nordeen notes that several conventional single-engine strike aircraft like the Douglas A-4 Skyhawk and LTV A-7 Corsair II had worse accident rates. The Los Angeles Times reported in 2003 that the Harrier "...has amassed the highest major accident rate of any military plane now in service. Forty-five Marines have died in 148 noncombat accidents". Colonel Lee Buland of the USMC declared the maintenance of a Harrier to be a "challenge"; the need to remove the wings before performing most work upon the engine, including engine replacements, meant the Harrier required considerable man-hours in maintenance, more than most aircraft. Buland noted however that the maintenance difficulties were unavoidable in order to create a V/STOL aircraft.

Engine

The Pegasus turbofan jet engine, developed in tandem with the P.1127 then the Harrier, was designed specifically for V/STOL manoeuvring. Bristol Siddeley developed it from their earlier conventional Orpheus turbofan engine as the core with Olympus compressor blades for the fan. The engine's thrust is directed through the four rotatable nozzles. The engine is equipped for water injection to increase thrust and takeoff performance in hot and high altitude conditions; in normal V/STOL operations the system would be used in landing vertically with a heavy weapons load. The water injection function had originally been added following the input of US Air Force Colonel Bill Chapman, who worked for the Mutual Weapons Development Team. Water injection was necessary in order to generate maximum thrust, if only for a limited time, and was typically used during landing, especially in high ambient temperatures.

The aircraft was initially powered by the Pegasus 6 engine which was replaced by the more powerful Pegasus 11 during the Harrier GR.1 to GR.3 upgrade process. The primary focus throughout the engine's development was on achieving high performance with as little weight as possible, tempered by the amount of funding that was available. Following the Harrier's entry to service the focus switched to improving reliability and extending engine life; a formal joint US–UK Pegasus Support Program operated for many years and spent a £3-million annual budget to develop engine improvements. Several variants have been released; the latest is the Pegasus 11–61 (Mk 107), which provides 23,800 lbf (106 kN) thrust, more than any previous engine.

Controls and handling

The Harrier has been described by pilots as "unforgiving". The aircraft is capable of both forward flight (where it behaves in the manner of a typical fixed-wing aircraft above its stall speed), as well as VTOL and STOL manoeuvres (where the traditional lift and control surfaces are useless) requiring skills and technical knowledge usually associated with helicopters. Most services demand great aptitude and extensive training for Harrier pilots, as well as experience in piloting both types of aircraft. Trainee pilots are often drawn from highly experienced and skilled helicopter pilots.

In addition to normal flight controls, the Harrier has a lever for controlling the direction of the four vectoring nozzles. It is viewed by senior RAF officers as a significant design success, that to enable and control the aircraft's vertical flight required only a single lever added in the cockpit. For horizontal flight, the nozzles are directed rearwards by shifting the lever to the forward position; for short or vertical takeoffs and landings, the lever is pulled back to point the nozzles downwards.

The Harrier has two control elements not found in conventional fixed-wing aircraft: the thrust vector and the reaction control system. The thrust vector refers to the slant of the four engine nozzles and can be set between 0° (horizontal, pointing directly backwards) and 98° (pointing down and slightly forwards). The 90° vector is normally deployed for VTOL manoeuvring. The reaction control is achieved by manipulating the control stick and is similar in action to the cyclic control of a helicopter. While irrelevant during forward flight mode, these controls are essential during VTOL and STOL manoeuvres.

The wind direction is a critical factor in VTOL manoeuvres. The procedure for vertical takeoff involves facing the aircraft into the wind. The thrust vector is set to 90° and the throttle is brought up to maximum, at which point the aircraft leaves the ground. The throttle is trimmed until a hover state is achieved at the desired altitude. For lower takeoff speeds the thrust vector is greater. The reaction control system involves a thrusters at key points in the aircraft's fuselage and nose, also the wingtips. Thrust from the engine can be temporarily syphoned to control and correct the aircraft's pitch and roll during vertical flight.

Rotating the vectored thrust nozzles into a forward-facing position during normal flight is called vectoring in forward flight, or "VIFFing". This is a dog-fighting tactic, allowing for more sudden braking and higher turn rates. Braking could cause a chasing aircraft to overshoot and present itself as a target for the Harrier it was chasing, a combat technique formally developed by the USMC for the Harrier in the early 1970s.

Differences between versions
The two largest users of the Harrier were the Royal Air Force and the United States Marine Corps (USMC). The exported model of the aircraft operated by the USMC was designated the AV-8A Harrier, which was broadly similar to the RAF's Harrier GR.1. Changes included the removal of all magnesium components, which corroded quickly at sea, and the integration of American radios and Identification Friend or Foe (IFF) systems; furthermore the outer pylons, unlike the RAF aircraft, were designed from delivery to be equipped with self-defence AIM-9 Sidewinder heat-seeking air-to-air missiles. Most of the AV-8As had been delivered with the more powerful Pegasus engine used in the GR.3 instead of the one used in the earlier GR.1. Two-seat Harriers were operated for training purposes; the body was stretched and a taller tail fin added. The RAF trained in the T.2 and T.4 versions, while T.4N and T.8 were training versions the Navy's Sea Harrier, with appropriate fittings. The US and Spain flew the TAV-8A and TAV-8S, respectively.

All RAF GR.1s and the initial AV-8As were fitted with the Ferranti FE541 inertial navigation/attack suite, but these were replaced in the USMC Harriers by a simpler Interface/Weapon Aiming Computer to aid quick turnaround between missions. The Martin-Baker ejection seats were also replaced by the Stencel SEU-3A in the American aircraft. The RAF had their GR.1 aircraft upgraded to the GR.3 standard, which featured improved sensors, a nose-mounted laser tracker, the integration of electronic countermeasure (ECM) systems and a further upgraded Pegasus Mk 103. The USMC upgraded their AV-8As to the AV-8C configuration; this programme involved the installation of ECM equipment and adding a new inertial navigation system to the aircraft's avionics. Substantial changes were the Lift Improvement Devices, to increase VTOL performance; at the same time several airframe components were restored or replaced to extend the life of the aircraft. Spain's Harriers, designated AV-8S or VA.1 Matador for the single-seater and TAV-8S or VAE.1 for the two-seater, were almost identical to USMC Harriers differing only in the radios fitted.

The Royal Navy's Fleet Air Arm (FAA) operated a substantially modified variant of the Harrier, the British Aerospace Sea Harrier. The Sea Harrier was intended for multiple naval roles and was equipped with radar and Sidewinder missiles for air combat duties as part of fleet air defence. The Sea Harrier was also fitted with navigational aids for carrier landings, modifications to reduce corrosion by seawater and a raised bubble-canopy covered cockpit for better visibility. The aircraft were later equipped to use AIM-120 AMRAAM beyond-visual-range anti-aircraft missiles and the more advanced Blue Vixen radar for longer range air-to-air combat, as well as Sea Eagle missiles for conducting anti-ship missions.

The McDonnell Douglas AV-8B Harrier II is the latest Harrier variant, a second-generation series to replace the first generation of Harrier jets already in service; all the above variants of the Harrier have mainly been retired with the Harrier II taking their place in the RAF, USMC and FAA. In the 1970s the United Kingdom considered two options for replacing their existing Harriers: joining McDonnell Douglas (MDC) in developing the BAE Harrier II, or the independent development of a "Big Wing" Harrier. The option of cooperation with MDC was chosen in 1982 over the more risky isolated approach. The original Harrier served as the basis for the British Aerospace Sea Harrier as it was required to fill the fighter role.

Operational history

Royal Air Force
The first RAF squadron to be equipped with the Harrier GR.1, No. 1 Squadron, started to convert to the aircraft at RAF Wittering in April 1969. An early demonstration of the Harrier's capabilities was the participation of two aircraft in the Daily Mail Transatlantic Air Race in May 1969, flying between St Pancras railway station, London and central Manhattan with the use of aerial refuelling. The Harrier completed the journey in 6 hours 11 minutes. Two Harrier squadrons were established in 1970 at the RAF's air base in Wildenrath to be part of its air force in Germany; another squadron was formed there two years later. In 1977, these three squadrons were moved forward to the air base at Gütersloh, closer to the prospective front line in the event of an outbreak of a European war.  One of the squadrons was disbanded and its aircraft distributed between the other two.

In RAF service, the Harrier was used in close air support (CAS), reconnaissance, and other ground-attack roles. The flexibility of the Harrier led to a long-term heavy deployment in West Germany as a conventional deterrent and potential strike weapon against Soviet aggression; from camouflaged rough bases the Harrier was expected to launch attacks on advancing armour columns from East Germany. Harriers were also deployed to bases in Norway and Belize, a former British colony. No. 1 Squadron was specifically earmarked for Norwegian operations in the event of war, operating as part of Allied Forces Northern Europe. The Harrier's capabilities were necessary in the Belize deployment, as it was the only RAF combat aircraft capable of safely operating from the airport's short runway; British forces had been stationed in Belize for several years due to tensions over a Guatemalan claim to Belizean territory; the forces were withdrawn in 1993, two years after Guatemala recognized the independence of Belize.

In the Falklands War in 1982, 10 Harrier GR.3s of No. 1 Squadron operated from the aircraft carrier . As the RAF Harrier GR.3 had not been designed for naval service, the 10 aircraft had to be rapidly modified prior to the departure of the task force. Special sealants against corrosion were applied and a new deck-based inertial guidance aid was devised to allow the RAF Harrier to land on a carrier as easily as the Sea Harrier. Transponders to guide aircraft back to the carriers during night-time operations were also installed, along with flares and chaff dispensers.

The Harrier GR.3s focused on providing close air support to the ground forces on the Falklands and attacking Argentine positions; suppressing enemy artillery was often a high priority. Sea Harriers were also used in the war, primarily conducting fleet air defence and combat air patrols against the threat of attacking Argentine fighters. However, both Sea Harriers and Harrier GR.3s were used in ground-attack missions against the main airfield and runway at Stanley.

If most of the Sea Harriers had been lost, the GR.3s would have replaced them in air patrol duties, even though the Harrier GR.3 was not designed for air defence operations; as such the GR.3s quickly had their outboard weapons pylons modified to take air-to-air Sidewinder missiles. From 10 to 24 May 1982, prior to British forces landing in the Falklands, a detachment of three GR.3s provided air defence for Ascension Island until three F-4 Phantom IIs arrived to take on this responsibility. During the Falklands War, the greatest threats to the Harriers were deemed to be surface-to-air missiles (SAMs) and small arms fire from the ground. In total, four Harrier GR.3s and six Sea Harriers were lost to ground fire, accidents, or mechanical failure. More than 2,000 Harrier sorties were conducted during the conflict—equivalent to six sorties per day per aircraft.

Following the Falklands war, British Aerospace explored the Skyhook, a new technique to operate Harriers from smaller ships. Skyhook would have allowed the launching and landing of Harriers from smaller ships by holding the aircraft in midair by a crane; secondary cranes were to hold weapons for rapid re-arming. This would potentially have saved fuel and allowed for operations in rougher seas. The system was marketed to foreign customers, and it was speculated that Skyhook could be applied to large submarines such as the Russian , but the system attracted no interest.

The first generation of Harriers did not see further combat with the RAF after the Falklands War, although they continued to serve for years afterwards. As a deterrent against further Argentine invasion attempts, No. 1453 Flight RAF was deployed to the Falkland Islands from August 1983 to June 1985. However the second generation Harrier IIs saw action in Bosnia, Iraq, and Afghanistan. The first generation Hawker Siddeley airframes were replaced by the improved Harrier II, which had been developed jointly between McDonnell Douglas and British Aerospace.

United States Marine Corps

The United States Marine Corps began showing a significant interest in the aircraft around the time the first RAF Harrier squadron was established in 1969, and this motivated Hawker Siddeley to further develop the aircraft to encourage a purchase. Although there were concerns in Congress about multiple coinciding projects in the close air support role, the Marine Corps were enthusiastic about the Harrier and managed to overcome efforts to obstruct its procurement.

The Marine Corps accepted its first AV-8A on 6 January 1971, at the Dunsfold Aerodrome, England and began testing it at Naval Air Station Patuxent River on 26 January.  The AV-8A entered service with the Marine Corps in 1971, replacing other aircraft in the Marines' attack squadrons. The service became interested in performing ship-borne operations with the Harrier. Admiral Elmo Zumwalt promoted the concept of a Sea Control Ship, a 15,000-ton light carrier equipped with Harriers and helicopters, to supplement the larger aircraft carriers of the US Navy. An amphibious assault ship, was converted into the Interim Sea Control Ship and operated as such between 1971 and 1973 with the purpose of studying the limits and possible obstacles for operating such a vessel. Since then the Sea Control Ship concept has been subject to periodic re-examinations and studies, often in the light of budget cuts and questions over the use of supercarriers.

Other exercises were performed to demonstrate the AV-8A's suitability for operating from various amphibious assault ships and aircraft carriers, including a deployment of 14 Harriers aboard  for six months in 1976. The tests showed, amongst other things, that the Harrier was capable of performing in weather where conventional carrier aircraft could not. In support of naval operations, the USMC devised and studied several methods to further integrate the Harrier. One result was Arapaho, a stand-by system to rapidly convert civilian cargo ships into seagoing platforms for operating and maintaining a handful of Harriers, to be used to augment the number of available ships to deploy upon.

When the reactivation of the s was under consideration, a radical design for a battleship-carrier hybrid emerged that would have replaced the ship's rear turret with a flight deck, complete with a hangar and two ski jumps, for operating several Harriers. However, the USMC considered the need for naval gunfire support to be a greater priority than additional platforms for carrier operations, while the cost and delay associated with such elaborate conversions was significant, and the concept was dropped.

The Marines Corps' concept for deploying the Harriers in a land-based expeditionary role focused on aggressive speed. Harrier forward bases and light maintenance facilities were to be set up in under 24 hours on any prospective battle area. The close proximity of forward bases allowed for a far greater sortie rate and reduced fuel consumption.

The AV-8A's abilities in air-to-air combat were tested by the Marine Corps by conducting mock dogfights with McDonnell Douglas F-4 Phantom IIs; these exercises trained pilots to use the vectoring-in-forward-flight (VIFF) capability to outmanoeuvre their opponents and showed that the Harriers could act as effective air-to-air fighters at close range. The success of Harrier operations countered scepticism of V/STOL aircraft, which had been judged to be expensive failures in the past. Marine Corps officers became convinced of the military advantages of the Harrier and pursued extensive development of the aircraft.

Starting in 1979, the USMC began upgrading their AV-8As to the AV-8C configuration—the work focused mainly on extending useful service lives and improving VTOL performance. The AV-8C and the remaining AV-8A Harriers were retired by 1987. These were replaced by the Harrier II, designated as the AV-8B, which was introduced into service in 1985. The performance of the Harrier in USMC service led to calls for the United States Air Force to procure Harrier IIs in addition to the USMC's own plans, but these never resulted in Air Force orders. Since the late 1990s, the AV-8B has been slated to be replaced by the F-35B variant of the Lockheed Martin F-35 Lightning II, a more modern V/STOL jet aircraft.

Like the next generation AV-8Bs, nevertheless, the AV-8A/C Harriers suffered many accidents, with around 40 aircraft lost and some 30 pilots killed during the 1970s and 1980s.

Other operators

Due to the Harrier's unique characteristics it attracted a large amount of interest from other nations, often as attempts to make their own V/STOL jets were unsuccessful, such as in the cases of the American XV-4 Hummingbird and the German VFW VAK 191B. Operations by the USMC aboard  in 1981 and by British Harriers and Sea Harriers in the Falklands War proved that the aircraft was highly effective in combat. These operations also demonstrated that "Harrier Carriers" provided a powerful presence at sea without the expense of big deck carriers.

Following the display of Harrier operations from small carriers, the navies of Spain and later Thailand bought the Harrier for use as their main carrier-based fixed-wing aircraft. Spain's purchase of Harriers was complicated by long-standing political friction between the British and Spanish governments of the era; even though the Harriers were manufactured in the UK they were sold to Spain with the US acting as an intermediary. During tests in November 1972, the British pilot John Farley showed that the wooden deck of Dédalo was able to withstand the temperature of the gases generated by the Harrier.  Since 1976, the Spanish Navy operated the AV-8S Matador from their aircraft carrier  (formerly the ); the aircraft provided both air defence and strike capabilities for the Spanish fleet. Spain later purchased five Harriers directly from the British government mainly to replace losses.

Hawker Siddeley aggressively marketed the Harrier for export. At one point the company was holding talks with Australia, Brazil, Switzerland, India and Japan. Of these only India became a customer, purchasing the Sea Harrier. At one point China came very close to becoming an operator of the first generation Harrier. Following an overture by the UK in the early 1970s, when relations with the West were warming, China became interested in the aircraft as it sought to modernise its armed forces; British Prime Minister James Callaghan noted significant hostility from the USSR over the sales bid. The deal was later cancelled by the UK as part of a diplomatic backlash after China invaded Vietnam in 1979.

The Spanish Navy, Thai Navy, Royal Air Force, and U.S. Marine Corps have all retired their first-generation Harriers. Spain sold seven single-seat and two twin-seat Harriers to Thailand in 1998.  The Royal Thai Navy's AV-8S Matadors were delivered as part of the air wing deployed on the new light aircraft carrier . The Thai Navy had from the start significant logistical problems keeping the Harriers operational due to a shortage of funds for spare parts and equipment, leaving only a few Harriers serviceable at a time. In 1999, two years after being delivered, only one airframe was in airworthy condition. Around 2003, Thailand considered acquiring former Royal Navy Sea Harriers, which were more suitable for maritime operations and better equipped for air defence, to replace their AV-8S Harriers; this investigation did not progress to a purchase. The last first-generation Harriers were retired by Thailand in 2006.

Potential operators 
Some countries almost purchased Harriers. British Aerospace held talks with Argentina, Australia, Brazil, China, Switzerland, India, and Japan.

Argentina 
When the Argentinian Navy looked for newer fighters in 1968 the US government only offered old A-4A planes instead of the A-4Fs Argentina wanted. Argentina contacted the British government in 1969 and expressed interest in buying from six to twelve Harrier GR.1s. In 1969 the Argentinian Navy received its second carrier, ARA 25 de Mayo, from the Netherlands. On her voyage home, Hawker Siddeley demonstrated a RAF Harrier GR.Mk.1 (XV757) but Argentina opted for the A-4Q Skyhawk instead. There were several problems to supply Argentina with Harrier jets and engines that prevented the deal from being closed, and when the US knew about the Harrier negotiations they quickly offered a better deal to Argentina. Some years later, before the 1982 war, British officials offered Argentina an aircraft carrier and Sea Harrier aircraft.

Australia 
Planning for a HMAS Melbourne aircraft carrier replacement began in 1981. After considering American, Italian, and Spanish designs, the Australian government accepted a British offer to sell , which would be operated with Harriers and helicopters. However, the Royal Navy withdrew the offer after the Falklands War, and the 1983 election of the Australian Labor Party led to the cancellation of plans to replace Melbourne.

China 
As early as 1972 the Chinese government started negotiating a purchase of up to 200 Harrier aircraft. Due to internal political issues, China put the negotiations on hold. In 1977 Li Chiang, the Chinese Minister of Foreign Trade, visited the UK and British Aerospace organised a Harrier flying demonstration. In November 1978, the Harrier-demonstration was repeated for the Chinese Vice-Premier Wang Chen during his UK visit. The Harrier deal would have meant British Government ignored United States laws that prohibited such sales to communist countries. The Soviet Union was also actively opposed to the UK selling weapons to the Chinese. In spite of that, British Aerospace convinced China that the Harrier was an effective close-support fighter and was good enough to act in a defensive role. In 1979, the Anglo-Sino deal was almost done before being cancelled by the Sino-Vietnamese War.

Switzerland 
The Swiss Air Force was interested in purchasing some Harriers as its doctrine was to operate in hidden and disperse locations during the Cold War. British Aerospace held talks with Switzerland offering AV-8s to replace De Havilland Venoms. A demonstration was made by test pilot John Farley and XV742/G-VSTO in 1971.

Variants

Harrier GR.1, GR.1A, GR.3 Single-seat versions for the RAF. The RAF ordered 118 of the GR.1/GR.3 series, with the last production aircraft delivery in December 1986. 122 built.
AV-8A, AV-8C Harrier Single-seat versions for the US Marine Corps. The USMC ordered 102 AV-8As (company designation: Harrier Mk. 50). The AV-8C was an upgrade to the AV-8A. 110 built.
AV-8S Matador  Export version of the AV-8A Harrier for the Spanish Navy, who designated them as VA-1 Matador; later sold to the Royal Thai Navy. 10 built.

Harrier T.2, T.2A, T.4, T.4A Two-seat training versions for the RAF, with a stretched body and taller tail fin. 25 built.
Harrier T.4N, T.8, T.60 Two-seat training versions for the Royal Navy and Indian Navy with avionics based on the Sea Harrier.
TAV-8A Harrier  Two-seat training version for the USMC, powered by a Pegasus Mk 103.
TAV-8S Matador Two-seat training version for the Spanish Navy and later sold to the Royal Thai Navy.

Operators

 Indian Navy (see Sea Harrier)

 Spanish Navy

 Royal Thai Navy

 Royal Air Force
 Royal Navy

 United States Marine Corps

Aircraft on display

Belize
GR.3
 ZD669 – Philip S. W. Goldson International Airport, Ladyville, Belize
No. 1417 Flight RAF

Canada
AV-8A
 158966 – Canada Aviation and Space Museum, Ottawa, Ontario

China

GR.3
 XZ965 – Beijing Air and Space Museum

Germany
GR.1
 XV278 – Luftwaffenmuseum der Bundeswehr, Gatow
GR.3
 XZ998 – Flugausstellung Hermeskeil at Hermeskeil

Poland
GR.3
 XW919 – Polish Aviation Museum, Kraków, Poland

New Zealand
GR.3
 XZ129 – Ashburton Aviation Museum, Ashburton, New Zealand

Thailand

AV-8S
 3109 – Royal Thai Air Force Museum

United Kingdom
GR.1
 XV277 – National Museum of Flight, East Fortune
 XV281 (Under Restoration) – South Yorkshire Aircraft Museum, Doncaster, South Yorkshire
 XV741 – Brooklands Museum, Surrey

GR.3
 XV744 – Tangmere Military Aviation Museum, Chichester, West Sussex
 XV748 – Yorkshire Air Museum, Elvington
 XV751 – Gatwick Aviation Museum, Surrey
 XV752 – South Yorkshire Aircraft Museum, Doncaster, South Yorkshire
 XV753 – Classic Air Force, St Mawgan, Newquay, Cornwall
 XV779 – RAF Wittering (Gate Guardian)
 XZ133 – Imperial War Museum, Duxford
 XZ964 – Royal Engineers Museum, Gillingham, Kent
 XZ968 – Muckleburgh Collection, Norfolk
 XZ997 – RAF Museum, Hendon
 XZ971 – MoD Donnington, Telford
 ZD667 – Bentwaters Cold War Museum, Suffolk
Mk.52 G-VTOL
 ZA250 – Brooklands Museum, Surrey
T.2
 XW269 – Caernarfon Airworld Aviation Museum, Gwynedd
T.4
 XW934 – Farnborough Air Sciences Trust, Farnborough, Hampshire
 XW268 – City of Norwich Aviation Museum, Norfolk
AV-8A
 159233 – Imperial War Museum North

United States
AV-8A
 158695 – Air Park, MCAS Yuma, Yuma, Arizona
 159239 – San Diego Air and Space Museum, San Diego, California
 158963 – Craven County Regional Airport, Grantham, North Carolina
 158976 – City of Havelock, Havelock, North Carolina
 Cockpit on display at Moffett Historical Museum, Moffett Federal Airfield, California

TAV-8A
 159381 – Oakland Aviation Museum, Oakland, California
 159382 – Pima Air & Space Museum, Tucson, Arizona
AV-8C
 158387 – Fort Worth Aviation Museum, Fort Worth, Texas
 158710 – Quonset Air Museum, North Kingstown, Rhode Island
 158959 – Pacific Coast Air Museum, Santa Rosa, California
 158975 – National Naval Aviation Museum, NAS Pensacola, Pensacola, Florida
 158977 – Museum of Flight, Seattle, Washington
 159232 – Intrepid Sea, Air & Space Museum, New York City, New York<ref>"AV-8C Harrier/159232." Intrepid Sea, Air & Space Museum. Retrieved: 10 December 2015.</ref>
 159238 – Hangar 25 Museum, Webb AFB (formerly), Big Spring, Texas
 159241 – Pima Air & Space Museum, Tucson, Arizona
 159247 – Naval Inventory Control Point (NAVICP) Philadelphia, Philadelphia, Pennsylvania
 159249 – United States Naval Museum of Armament and Technology, NCC China Lake (North), Ridgecrest, California

Specifications (Harrier GR.3)

Popular culture

See also

References

Notes

Citations

Bibliography
 Bishop, Chris and Chris Chant. Aircraft Carriers. Grand Rapids, Michigan, US: Zenith Imprint, 2004. .
 Braybrook, Roy. Battle for the Falklands: Air Forces. Oxford, UK: Osprey Publishing, 1982. .
 Brown, Kevin. "The Plane That Makes Airfields Obsolete." Popular Mechanics, 133(6), June 1970, pp. 80–83.
 Bull, Stephen. Encyclopedia of Military Rechnology and Innovation. Westport, Connecticut, US: Greenwood Publishing, 2004. .
 Burke, David J. Harriers and Close Air Support. Air Enthusiast 115, January–February 2005, p. 75 
 Burr, Lawrence and Peter Bull. US Fast Battleships 1938–91: The Iowa Class. New York, US: Osprey Publishing, 2010. .
 Buttler, Tony. British Secret Projects: Jet Fighters Since 1950. Hinckley, UK: Midland Publishing, 2000. .
 
 Chant, Chris. Air War in the Falklands 1982 (Osprey Combat Aircraft #28). Oxford, UK: Osprey Publishing, 2001. .
 Congress Committee on Appropriations. "Department of Defense Appropriations for 1979: Part 5". Washington D.C., US: U.S. Government Printing Office, 1979.
 Davies, Peter and Anthony M. Thornborough. The Harrier Story.  Annapolis, Maryland, US: Naval Institute Press, 1997. .
 Ellis, Ken. Wrecks & Relics, 21st edition. Manchester, UK: Crécy Publishing, 2008. .
 Evans, Andy. BAe/McDonald Douglas Harrier. Ramsbury, UK: The Crowood Press, 1998. .
 Freedman, Lawrence. The Official History of the Falklands Campaign. Volume II: War and Diplomacy. London, UK: Routledge, 2007. .
 Friedman, Norman. U.S. Aircraft Carriers: an Illustrated Design History. Annapolis, Maryland, US: Naval Institute Press, 1983. .
 
 Gunston, W.T. "Pegasus updating prospects". Flight International, 22 January 1977, pp. 189–191.
 Jackson, Paul. "British Aerospace/McDonnell Douglas Harrier". World Air Power Journal, Volume 6, Summer 1991. pp. 46–105.
 Jefford, C.G., ed. The RAF Harrier Story. London, UK: Royal Air Force Historical Society, 2006. .
 Jenkins, Dennis R. Boeing / BAe Harrier. North Branch, Minnesota, US: Specialty Press, 1998. .
 Layman, R D and Stephen McLaughlin. The Hybrid Warship. London: Conway, 1991. .
 Markman, Steve and Bill Holder. Straight Up: A History of Vertical Flight. Atglen, PA: Schiffer Publishing, 2000. .
 Mason, Francis K. Harrier. Wellingborough, UK: Patrick Stephens Limited, Third edition, 1986. .
 Mason, Francis K. Hawker Aircraft since 1920. London, UK: Putnam, 1991. .
 Miller, David M.O. and Chris Miller. "Modern Naval Combat". Crescent Books, 1986. .
 Moxton, Julian. "Supersonic Harrier: One Step Closer". Flight International, 4 December 1982, pp. 1633–1635.
 Nordeen, Lon O. Harrier II, Validating V/STOL. Annapolis, Maryland, US: Naval Institute Press, 2006. .
 Spick, Mike, ed. The Great Book of Modern Warplanes. St. Paul, Minnesota, US: MBI Publishing, 2000. .
 Sturtivant, Ray. Fleet Air Arm Fixed-Wing Aircraft since 1946. Tonbridge, Kent, UK: Air-Britain (Historians), 2004. .
 Sturtivant, Ray. RAF Flying Training and Support Units since 1912. Tonbridge, Kent, UK: Air-Britain (Historians), 2007. .
 Taylor, John W.R. Jane's All The World's Aircraft 1988–89. Coulsdon, UK: Jane's Defence Data, 1988. .
 Vann, Frank. Harrier jump jet. New York, US: Bdd Promotional Book Co, 1990. .

Further reading

 Farley, John OBE. A View From The Hover: My Life in Aviation. Bath, UK: Seager Publishing/Flyer Books, 2010, first edition 2008. .
 Gunston, Bill and Mike Spick. Modern Air Combat: The Aircraft, Tactics and Weapons Employed in Aerial Warfare Today. New York: Crescent Books, 1983. .
 Mason, Francis. Hawker Aircraft since 1920. London: Putnam Publishing, 1971. .
 Polmar, Norman and Dana Bell. One Hundred Years of World Military Aircraft. Annapolis, Maryland, US: Naval Institute Press, 2003. .

External links

 Harrier history website (see archive)
 Harrier page on globalsecurity.org
 Harriers lost in the Falklands
 Harrier GR.3 in Beijing Aviation Museum, China 
 "Harrier – World's First Fixed-wing V/STOL Weapons System" a 1967 article in Flight "Harriers for the United States?" 1969 Flight article on the USMC case for the Harrier
 "Woodland Warfare" a 1972 Flight article on Harrier dispersed operations
 "V for Two" a 1972 Flight article on the two-seat Harrier T.2
 "In the Air – Harrier" a 1973 Flight'' article on flying the Harrier

1960s British fighter aircraft
Harrier
V/STOL aircraft by thrust vectoring
Single-engined jet aircraft
High-wing aircraft
Harrier Jump Jet
Aircraft first flown in 1967